Bring Me Sunshine was a gala concert held at the London Palladium on 28 November 1984 in the presence of the Duke of Edinburgh in aid of the British Heart Foundation and was held in memory of the comedian Eric Morecambe who had died the previous May after many years of heart problems.  It was hosted by Eric's long-time partner Ernie Wise and featured a host of personalities all paying their tribute to Morecambe. The show began with a dance routine, the theme for the whole evening's music being "sunshine" the dancers were accompanied by You Are The Sunshine Of My Life which was followed by the big entrance of Ernie Wise who first spoke, and then sang the duo's signature tune.  This was an emotive moment for Wise and one that showed how big a part Morecambe had played in his life.  Other stars that appeared over the course of the evening were:

 Benny Hill (who performed his headmaster routine complete with lectern)
 Dickie Henderson (with his well-known "off-key singer" routine)
 Cannon & Ball (who had been citied as the next big double act)
 Kenny Ball & His Jazzmen (who had appeared on so many of their shows)
 Angela Rippon (who recreated her tiller girl dance routine)
 James Casey, Eli Woods & Roy Castle (elephant in the box routine)
 Bruce Forsyth (who played piano and did a stand-up routine)
 Des O'Connor (the long-term butt of Morecambe's jibes)

There was also a sequence in which the guests of honour were announced and appeared on stage, these included the following guest stars, fans and celebrities:

 John Thaw
 Sheila Hancock
 Martin Shaw
 Glenda Jackson
 Fulton Mackay
 Dickie Davies
 Francis Matthews

The programme was filmed live and televised on ITV on Christmas Day of that year; in his summing up Des O'Connor gave a touching and heartfelt tribute to Morecambe proclaiming that "...on the way here tonight I went through Trafalgar Square and the Christmas decorations were going up. I looked at the giant tree and thought to myself 'there's going to be one less star on the tree this year.' "  It was a glittering night that featured the cream of British talent paying tribute to a man who had been considered the best of the best among his peers.

The programme, made and broadcast by Thames Television was aired once and has never been repeated or made commercially available in any format.  However, the segment of Bruce Forsyth's piano playing and dancing was used in a compilation programme "Heroes Of Comedy" made in 1994 for Channel 4.

References

Benefit concerts in the United Kingdom
Morecambe and Wise
November 1984 events in the United Kingdom
1984 in British music